Stanisław Karpiel (May 8, 1909 – November 12, 1992) was a Polish cross-country skier who competed in the 1936 Winter Olympics. He was born in Kościelisko and died in Zakopane.

In 1936 he was a member of the Polish cross-country relay team which finished seventh in the 4x10 km relay event. In the 50 km competition he finished 26th and in the 18 km event he finished 42nd.

During World War II he was a member of the Armia Krajowa and had an alias Bicz (whip). He was later awarded the Cross of Valor military decoration.

References

External links
 Profile 

1909 births
1992 deaths
People from Tatra County
Polish male cross-country skiers
Olympic cross-country skiers of Poland
Cross-country skiers at the 1936 Winter Olympics
Home Army members
Sportspeople from Lesser Poland Voivodeship